DAP or Dap may refer to:

Science
 DAP (gene), human gene that encodes death-associated proteins, which mediate programmed cell death
 Diamidophosphate, phosphorylating compound
 Diaminopimelic acid, amino acid derivative of lysine
 Diaminopyridine, drug for the treatment of rare muscular diseases
 Diaminopyrimidine, a class of organic chemicals
 Diammonium phosphate, chemical used as a fertilizer and flame retardant
 Dog appeasing pheromone, synthetic analogue of a canine hormone 
 Dose area product, a measurement of radiation exposure

Technology
 DAP (software), a statistical analysis program
 Debug Access Port, for ARM processors
 Digital Adoption Platform, a marketing term for software from WalkMe
 Digital Archive Project, a collaboration for publishing non-mainstream TV programmes
 Digital Audio Player, a class of electronic devices that play digital audio
 Direct-Action Penetrator, the gunship version of the Sikorsky UH-60 Black Hawk helicopter
 Directory Access Protocol, computer networking standard
 Distributed Array Processor, the first commercial massively parallel computer
 Domain Application Protocol for distributed computing
 Download Accelerator Plus, download manager
 Sinking (metalworking) or dapping, a metalworking technique

Companies
 Aerovías DAP, ICAO code DAP, a Chilean airline group
 DAP Helicópteros, ICAO code DHE, helicopter subsidiary
 DAP Products, American manufacturer of sealant materials
 DAP Technologies, division of Roper Industries
 Department of Aircraft Production, World War II name for Government Aircraft Factories, Australia
 DAP Beaufort, a variant of the Bristol Beaufort bomber aircraft
 Distributed Art Publishers, an American company that distributes and publishes

Organizations
 DAP Championship, former golf tournament 
 DAP Racing, former US horse-racing partnership
 Democratic Action Party (Malaysia), a Malaysian political party
 Departamento Aeroportuário (RS), Department of Aviation of the State of Rio Grande do Sul, Brazil
 Development Assessment Panels, independent bodies overseeing development in Western Australia
 Dienst für Analyse und Prävention, precursor of the Federal Intelligence Service, Switzerland
 Dipartimento dell'amministrazione penitenziaria, Prisons branch of the Ministry of Justice (Italy)
 Direction de l'Administration pénitentiaire, Prisons branch of the Ministry of Justice (France)
 German Workers' Party, Deutsche Arbeiterpartei or DAP, precursor of the Nazi Party (1919–1920)
 German Workers' Party (Austria-Hungary), Deutsche Arbeiterpartei or DAP (1903–1918)
 German Socialist Labour Party of Poland, originally named Deutsche Arbeiterpartei von Polens or DAP (1922–1925)

Places
 DAP, the IATA airport code for Darachula Airport, Khalanga, Darchula, Nepal 
 Dap, Iran, a village in Iran
 Durham Athletic Park, a former minor league baseball park in Durham, North Carolina, US

People
 Ashok Kondabolu, stage name Dapwell or Dap, American rapper
 Dap 'Sugar' Willie, American actor and comedian

Other uses
 Dap greeting or fist bump
 Dap, ancient name for the daf, a frame drum
 Daps or plimsoll shoes
 Delivered at place, an international commercial term
 Developmentally appropriate practice, in childhood education 
 Draw-a-Person test, a psychological test

See also
 Dapp (disambiguation)